Plala (ぷらら) is a major Japanese Internet service provider operated by NTT Plala Inc. It was established in 1995 and focuses on consumer internet services. Its major stockholder is NTT Communications Corp.  The company's name was changed to "NTT Plala" from "Plala" on March 1, 2008.

On May 26, 2022, NTT Docomo announced that it would absorb Plala on July 1, consolidating the businesses of the two companies.

References

2331312

External links
  Official Plala website

Internet service providers of Japan
Nippon Telegraph and Telephone
NTT Communications
Telecommunications companies established in 1995
Mobile virtual network operators